Katy Roberts is a field hockey player from England.

External links
 

Living people
English female field hockey players
Female field hockey goalkeepers
Year of birth missing (living people)